Kayumjan Sharipov (born 27 June 1991) is a Kyrgyzstani football player for Türk Metal Kırıkkalespor.

Career

Club
In Februar 2019, Sharipov joined Gandzasar Kapan on loan for the remainder of the 2013–14 season.

International
Sharipov made his debut for the senior Kyrgyzstan team in 2011, when he played in 2014 FIFA World Cup qualifiers against Uzbekistan.

He scored his first goal for the senior team in June 2012, in a friendly against Kazakhstan. The same summer he was one of the key players of the U-22 team, playing in all five matches of the 2013 AFC U-22 Asian Cup qualification. He scored twice during the campaign, however this did not help his team, with Kyrgyzstan taking the third place in the group and not reaching the finals.

Sharipov was regarded as one of the best players in Kyrgyzstan's successful 2014 AFC Challenge Cup qualifiers campaign. Starting in two matches and used as a substitute in one more, he assisted David Tetteh in scoring a winner in a 1–0 win against Pakistan.

Career statistics

International

Statistics accurate as of match played 5 September 2014

International goals

References

External links
 
 
 
 

1991 births
Living people
Kyrgyzstani footballers
Kyrgyzstani expatriate footballers
Kyrgyzstan international footballers
FC Dordoi Bishkek players
FC Gandzasar Kapan players
Ankaraspor footballers
Expatriate footballers in Armenia
Expatriate footballers in Turkey
Association football midfielders
Association football forwards
Kyrgyz Premier League players